Aslı Özge (born 3 July 1975) is a Turkish director, scenarist and producer.

Life 
Özge was born on 1 January 1975 in Istanbul. She graduated from Marmara University, Faculty of Fine Arts, Department of Cinema and Television. During her time as a student, her short film Capital C was shown at many festivals and won prizes. After graduation, she settled in Berlin where she studied philosophy.

Career 
In 2003, she directed her feature film April with the support of German Film and Television Academy and a German TV channel. This film was not released in Turkey. In 2005, she completed the filming of her documentary titled Hesperos'un Çömezleri in Istanbul. Her feature film Soluksuz was awarded the Balkan Fund Script Development Award at the 46th International Thessaloniki Film Festival. In 2010, he wrote and directed the film titled Men on the Bridge. She has continued to work in both Turkey and Germany, and her movie Hayatboyu was released in 2013.

Filmography

Cinema and TV movies  
Ansızın - 2016 (Cinema Film)
Hayatboyu (Lifelong) - 2013 (Cinema Film)
Köprüdekiler (Men on The Bridge) - 2009
Ein Bisschen April (Biraz Nisan) - 2003 (TV Film)

Documentary films 
Hesperos'un Çömezleri - 2005

Short films 
Capital C - 2000
Zamana dair Parçalar - 2000
Quirck - 1999
3 ETC - 1998
Aslında - 1997

Awards 

|-
| 2000
| Capital C
| 22nd İFSAK National Short Film and Documentary Competition, Fiction Video, Best Film Award
| 
|-
| 2009
| Men on the Bridge
| 16th Golden Boll Film Festival, Grand Jury Best Film Award
| 
|-
| 2009
| Men on the Bridge
| 28th International Istanbul Film Festival, Best Turkish Film
| 
|-
| 2010
| Men on the Bridge
| 21st International Ankara Film Festival, Best Film
| 
|-
| 2013
| Hayatboyu
| 32nd International Istanbul Film Festival, Best Director
| 
|-
| 2016
| Ansızın
| 35th International Istanbul Film Festival, FIPRESCI Award
| 
|-
| 2016
| Ansızın
| International Berlin Film Festival
|

References

External links 

Living people
1975 births
Turkish women film directors
Turkish female screenwriters